Own Bir Beyglu (also Romanized as Own Bīr Beyglū and Ūnbīr Beyglū) is a village in Ojarud-e Gharbi Rural District, in the Central District of Germi County, Ardabil Province, Iran. At the 2006 census, its population was 418, in 87 families.

References 

Towns and villages in Germi County